The 2019 NFL season was the 100th season of the National Football League (NFL) and the 54th of the Super Bowl era. The season began on September 5, 2019, with the NFL Kickoff Game, in which the Green Bay Packers defeated the Chicago Bears. The season concluded with Super Bowl LIV, the league's championship game, on February 2, 2020, at Hard Rock Stadium in Miami, Florida in which the American Football Conference (AFC) champion Kansas City Chiefs defeated the National Football Conference (NFC) champion San Francisco 49ers, to win their second Super Bowl championship. This was the final NFL season with the 12-team playoff format.

The 2019 season was also the last season for the Oakland Raiders after playing in Oakland for 47 non-consecutive years before their relocation to Las Vegas for 2020 with the completion of Allegiant Stadium. The Raiders were previously approved for relocation in March 2017 but spent the last two seasons at RingCentral Coliseum.

Player movement
The 2019 NFL league year and trading period began on March 13. On March 8, teams were allowed to exercise 2019 options for players with option clauses in their contracts, to submit qualifying offers to their pending restricted free agents and to submit minimum salary tenders to retain exclusive negotiating rights to their players with expiring 2018 contracts who had fewer than three accrued seasons of free-agent credit. Teams were required to be under the salary cap using the "Top 51" definition (in which the team's 51 highest-paid players must have a combined salary cap). On March 11, clubs were allowed to contact and begin contract negotiations with the agents of players who were set to become unrestricted free agents.

Free agency
Free agency began on March 13. Notable players to change teams included:

 Quarterbacks Blake Bortles (Jacksonville to Los Angeles Rams), Ryan Fitzpatrick (Tampa Bay to Miami), and Nick Foles (Philadelphia to Jacksonville).
 Running backs C. J. Anderson (Los Angeles Rams to Detroit), Le'Veon Bell (Pittsburgh to New York Jets), Tevin Coleman (Atlanta to San Francisco), Frank Gore (Miami to Buffalo), Kareem Hunt (Kansas City to Cleveland), Mark Ingram II (New Orleans to Baltimore), and LeSean McCoy (Buffalo to Kansas City).
 Wide receivers Danny Amendola (Miami to Detroit), Cole Beasley (Dallas to Buffalo), John Brown (Baltimore to Buffalo), Randall Cobb (Green Bay to Dallas), Cordarrelle Patterson (New England to Chicago), Andre Roberts (New York Jets to Buffalo), Golden Tate (Philadelphia to New York Giants), and Demaryius Thomas (Houston to New England).
Tight ends Charles Clay (Buffalo to Arizona) and Jesse James (Pittsburgh to Detroit).
 Offensive linemen Trent Brown (New England to Oakland), Ja'Wuan James (Miami to Denver), Mitch Morse (Kansas City to Buffalo), and Rodger Saffold (Los Angeles Rams to Tennessee).
 Defensive linemen Trey Flowers (New England to Detroit), Malik Jackson (Jacksonville to Philadelphia), Gerald McCoy (Tampa Bay to Carolina), Sheldon Richardson (Minnesota to Cleveland), Ndamukong Suh (Los Angeles Rams to Tampa Bay), and Cameron Wake (Miami to Tennessee).
 Linebackers Kwon Alexander (Tampa Bay to San Francisco), Vontaze Burfict (Cincinnati to Oakland), Thomas Davis (Carolina to Los Angeles Chargers), Jordan Hicks (Philadelphia to Arizona), Justin Houston (Kansas City to Indianapolis), Clay Matthews (Green Bay to Los Angeles Rams), CJ Mosley (Baltimore to New York Jets), Preston Smith (Washington to Green Bay), Za'Darius Smith (Baltimore to Green Bay), and Terrell Suggs (Baltimore to Arizona).
 Defensive backs Adrian Amos (Chicago to Green Bay), Ha Ha Clinton-Dix (Washington to Chicago), Landon Collins (New York Giants to Washington), Lamarcus Joyner (Los Angeles Rams to Oakland), Tyrann Mathieu (Houston to Kansas City), Earl Thomas (Seattle to Baltimore), and Eric Weddle (Baltimore to Los Angeles Rams).
 Kicker Jason Myers (New York Jets to Seattle).

Trades
The following notable trades were made during the 2019 league year:

 March 13: Baltimore traded QB Joe Flacco to Denver for their 2019 fourth-round selection (113th overall).
 March 13: The New York Giants traded WR Odell Beckham Jr. and DE Olivier Vernon to Cleveland for G Kevin Zeitler, SS Jabrill Peppers, their 2019 first-round selection (17th overall), and their 2019 third-round selection (95th overall).
 March 13: Philadelphia traded DE Michael Bennett and a 2020 seventh-round selection to New England for their 2020 fifth-round selection.
 March 13: Pittsburgh traded WR Antonio Brown to Oakland for their 2019 third-round selection (66th overall) and their 2019 fifth-round selection (141st overall).
 March 13: Oakland traded G Kelechi Osemele and their 2019 sixth-round selection (196th overall) to the New York Jets for their 2019 fifth-round selection (140th overall).
 March 13: Tampa Bay traded WR DeSean Jackson and their 2020 seventh-round selection to Philadelphia for their 2019 sixth-round selection (197th overall).
 March 13: Kansas City traded OLB Dee Ford to San Francisco for their 2020 second-round selection.
 March 15: Miami traded QB Ryan Tannehill and their 2019 sixth-round selection (188th overall) to Tennessee for their 2019 seventh-round selection (233rd overall) and their 2020 fourth-round selection.
 March 28: Miami traded DE Robert Quinn to Dallas for their 2020 sixth-round selection.
 March 28: Chicago traded RB Jordan Howard to Philadelphia for their 2020 sixth-round selection.
 April 1: Cleveland traded DE Emmanuel Ogbah to Kansas City for SS Eric Murray.
 April 23: Seattle traded DE Frank Clark and their 2019 third-round selection (92nd overall) to Kansas City for their 2019 first-round selection (29th overall), their 2019 third-round selection (84th overall), and a 2020 second-round selection.
 April 26: Arizona traded QB Josh Rosen and a 2020 fifth-round selection to Miami for their 2019 second-round selection (62nd overall).
 August 8: Cleveland traded RB Duke Johnson to Houston for a 2020 third round pick.
 August 9: Buffalo traded DE Eli Harold to Philadelphia for OL Ryan Bates.
 August 22: Arizona traded S Rudy Ford to Philadelphia for DT Bruce Hector.
 August 28: New England traded a 2020 fourth-round pick to Baltimore for a 2020 sixth-round pick and G Jermaine Eluemunor.
 August 31: Miami traded OT Laremy Tunsil and WR Kenny Stills to Houston for S Johnson Bademosi, OT Julién Davenport, for a 2020 first-round pick, a 2021 first-round pick and second-round pick.
 August 31: Houston traded OT Martinas Rankin to Kansas City for RB Carlos Hyde.
 September 1: Houston traded DE Jadeveon Clowney to Seattle for a 2020 third round pick, DE Jacob Martin, and DE Barkevious Mingo.
 September 2: Miami traded LB Kiko Alonso to New Orleans for LB Vince Biegel.
 September 10: New England traded WR Demaryius Thomas to the New York Jets for a 2021 sixth-round selection.
 September 16: Miami traded S Minkah Fitzpatrick and a 2020 fifth round pick and 2021 sixth round pick to Pittsburgh in exchange for their 2020 first and fifth round picks, and their 2021 sixth-round pick.
 September 30: Philadelphia traded S Jonathan Cyprien and a 2020 seventh-round pick to Atlanta for LB Duke Riley and a 2020 sixth-round pick.
 October 7: Buffalo traded WR Zay Jones to Oakland to for a 2021 fifth-round pick.
 October 15: The Los Angeles Rams traded CB Marcus Peters to Baltimore for LB Kenny Young and a 2020 fifth-round pick.
 October 15: The Los Angeles Rams traded a 2020 first-round pick, a 2021 first-round pick and a 2021 fourth-round pick to Jacksonville for CB Jalen Ramsey.
 October 21: Oakland traded CB Gareon Conley to Houston for a 2020 third-round pick.
 October 22: New England traded a 2020 second-round pick to Atlanta for WR Mohamed Sanu.
 October 22: Denver traded WR Emmanuel Sanders and a 2020 fifth-round pick to San Francisco for a 2020 third-round pick and a 2020 fourth-round pick.
 October 24: New England traded DE Michael Bennett to Dallas for a 2021 seventh-round pick that may turn into a sixth-round pick.
 October 28: The New York Jets traded DL Leonard Williams to the New York Giants for a 2020 third-round pick and a condition 2021 fifth-round pick.
 October 28: Cleveland traded DE Genard Avery to Philadelphia for 2021 fourth-round pick.
 October 29: The Los Angeles Rams traded CB Aqib Talib and a 2020 fifth-round pick to Miami for a 2022 seventh-round pick.

Notable retirements
The following notable players retired prior to the 2019 season:

 LB NaVorro Bowman – Three-time Pro Bowler and four-time first-team All-Pro. Played for the San Francisco 49ers and Oakland Raiders in an eight-year career.
 RB Jamaal Charles – Four-time Pro Bowler and three-time All-Pro (two first-team, one second-team). Played for the Kansas City Chiefs, Denver Broncos and Jacksonville Jaguars in an 11-year career.
 LB Derrick Johnson – Four-time Pro Bowl Selection and two-time All Pro (one first-team, one second-team). Played for the Kansas City Chiefs and Oakland Raiders in a 14-year career.
 TE Rob Gronkowski – Five-time Pro Bowler, four-time first-team All-Pro, three-time Super Bowl champion (XLIX, LI, and LIII), and 2014 Comeback Player of the Year. Played for the New England Patriots for his entire nine-year career.
 P Shane Lechler – Seven-time Pro Bowler and nine-time All-Pro (six first-team, three second-team). Played for the Raiders and Texans during his 18-year career.
 QB Andrew Luck – Four-time Pro Bowler, first overall selection in the 2012 NFL Draft, and 2018 Comeback Player of the Year. Played his entire seven-year career with the Indianapolis Colts.

 DT Haloti Ngata – Five-time Pro Bowler, five-time All-Pro (two first-team, three second-team) and Super Bowl XLVII champion. Played nine of his 13 years with the Ravens, with shorter stints with the Lions and Eagles.
 LB Brian Orakpo – Four-time Pro Bowler. Played for the Redskins and Titans over a ten-year career.
 DE Julius Peppers – Nine-time Pro Bowler, six-time All-Pro (three first-team, three second-team), and 2002 Defensive Rookie of the Year. Played for the Panthers, Bears and Packers during his 17-year career.
 G Josh Sitton – Four-time Pro Bowler, three-time All-Pro (one first-team, two second-team) and Super Bowl XLV champion. Played for the Packers, Bears and Dolphins during his 11-year career.
 DT Kyle Williams – Six-time Pro Bowler and two-time first-team All-Pro. Played for the Buffalo Bills for his entire 13-year career.

Other retirements

Draft

The 2019 NFL Draft was held from April 25–27 in Nashville, Tennessee. The Arizona Cardinals selected Oklahoma quarterback Kyler Murray with the first overall selection.

Officiating changes
Walt Coleman III retired: With 30 seasons as an NFL official, Coleman was the longest-tenured. Former NFL Europe referee Adrian Hill, a longtime official in various positions, replaced Coleman.
 Pete Morelli: Morelli retired after having spent 22 seasons as an NFL official. Scott Novak, one of the Big 12 Conference's most decorated referees, succeeded Morelli.
 John Parry retired after being the referee in Super Bowl LIII to join the Monday Night Football booth as a rules analyst. He had spent 19 seasons as an official and 12 as a head referee. Brad Rogers, a field judge for the past two seasons who was previously a referee in Conference USA and the Southeastern Conference, succeeded Parry. Combined with the 2018 offseason retirements of Ed Hochuli, Terry McAulay, Gene Steratore and Jeff Triplette, the league was forced to replace seven of its 17 referee positions within a two-year period. In July 2019, the NFL announced that all of the league's officials would return to part-time status. For the previous two seasons, under a pilot program, a small number of NFL officials were classified as full-time employees of the NFL.
The following officials were hired:

 Roddy Ames (Replay Official)
 Saleem Choudhry (Replay Official)
 Terry Killens (Umpire)
 Patrick Holt (Down Judge)
 Matthew Sumstine (Replay Official)
 Tripp Sutter (Line Judge)
 Nate Jones (Field Judge)
 Dave Hawkshaw (Side Judge)
 Jimmy Russell (Side Judge)

The following official retired:

 Walt Coleman (Referee)
 John Parry (Referee)
 Pete Morelli (Referee)
 Steve Stelljes (Down Judge)
 Hugo Cruz (Down Judge) fired mid-season

Rule changes
The following rule changes were approved for the 2019 season at the NFL owners' meeting on March 26:
 Make permanent the experimental kickoff rules from the  season.
 Abolish all blindside blocks anywhere on the field (personal foul, 15 yards).
 As a one-year experiment, make the following plays reviewable, subject to coaches' challenges outside of the final 2:00 of each half, and subject to booth review after the two-minute warning of each half or entire overtime:
 Pass interference, whether called or not (modified in June 2019)
 Scoring plays and turnovers negated by penalties.
 Any extra point or two-point conversion attempt.
 Change how double fouls are enforced after a change in possession; the last team to possess retains the ball at the spot of enforcement. If the enforcement spot is after a touchback, the ball is placed at the 20-yard line (after punt or turnover) or 25-yard line (free kick). If the spot of enforcement is in the end zone, the ball is placed at the 1-yard line.
 Make scrimmage kick rules apply if a missed field goal is touched in the end zone before hitting the ground, and if the ball is touched by either team behind the line of scrimmage.
 Allow teams to enforce a personal foul or unsportsmanlike conduct penalty committed during a touchdown on either the try or on the ensuing kickoff. Previously, these fouls were required to be enforced on the ensuing kickoff.
 Individuals not in uniform who enter the field to celebrate a play will draw an unsportsmanlike conduct penalty (15 yards, and automatic first down if on the defensive team).
 Players who make any flagrant "football" play risk immediate disqualification. Previously, this was limited to players who make a flagrant "non-football" play.

An additional rule change was built upon a rule originally passed in 2018. The NFL limited helmets to a list of 34 league-approved models, up from the 23 originally approved in 2018. The grandfather clause allowing existing players to wear their previous non-approved helmets expired, and 32 players were required to change helmets. In May 2019, the NFL banned Oklahoma drills, "bull in the ring," and other high-contact drills from team practices. In June 2019, the league clarified March 2019 temporary rule change regarding reviews of pass interference plays as follows:
 The initial rule passed in March 2019 regarding review of pass interference stays.
 A ruling will only be changed if there is clear and obvious evidence that pass interference did or did not occur (as is the standard for any other replay review).
 All pass plays are subject to review for pass interference, including the "Hail Mary" play.

2019 deaths

Members of the Pro Football Hall of Fame
Pat Bowlen Bowlen owned the Denver Broncos since 1984. His Broncos won three Super Bowls during his tenure (XXXII, XXXIII and 50). He was inducted in 2019 but died from complications of Alzheimer's disease at the age of 75 on June 13, before the induction ceremonies. Under the terms of a succession plan, the team will be operated by a trust headed by longtime executive Joe Ellis until it can be determined which of Bowlen's five surviving children will inherit the team.

Cliff Branch  Branch was a wide receiver who played for the Oakland/Los Angeles Raiders from 1972-1986.3 Time Super bowl champion (XI, XV, XVIII,) 4-time pro bowl, and 3 time first team all pro. He was inducted into the Pro Football Hall of Fame in 2022. He died August 3, aged 71.

Willie Brown Brown spent his first four seasons with the Denver Broncos (1963–1966) and his last twelve with Oakland Raiders (1967–1978), winning Super Bowl XI with the Raiders. Brown was also a nine-time Pro Bowler and was enshrined into the Pro Football Hall of Fame in 1984. He died on October 22 at the age of 78.

Nick Buoniconti Buoniconti, inducted into the Hall of Fame in 2001, was an eight-time Pro Bowl linebacker who played seven seasons with the Boston Patriots from 1962–1968 and seven more with the Miami Dolphins from 1969–1974 and 1976. He won two Super Bowls with the Dolphins in 1972 and 1973. Buoniconti died on July 30 at the age of 78.

Forrest Gregg Gregg, a guard, spent all but the final season of his playing career with the Green Bay Packers, a member of the Packers' 1960s dynasty. In his final year, he helped the Dallas Cowboys team win Super Bowl VI. Gregg was inducted into the Hall of Fame in 1977, his first year of eligibility. He also had a less illustrious coaching career in the NFL, college football and the Canadian Football League in the late 1970s, 1980s and into the 1990s, most successfully leading the 1981 Cincinnati Bengals to an AFC championship and a loss in Super Bowl XVI to the San Francisco 49ers. Gregg died on April 12 at the age of 85.

Jim Langer Langer, who played center for 11 NFL seasons, nine with the Miami Dolphins alongside Buoniconti (with the team earning its perfect season during his rookie year) and two with the Minnesota Vikings, was inducted into the Hall of Fame in 1987. He died on August 29 at the age of 71.

Gino Marchetti Marchetti was a defensive end who played 14 seasons in the NFL, 13 with the Baltimore Colts. Marchetti won two NFL championships, was selected to 11 Pro Bowls and made earned first-team All-Pro designations with the Colts. He was inducted into the Hall of Fame in 1972. Marchetti died on April 29 at the age of 93.

Bart Starr Starr played quarterback for the Green Bay Packers during his entire 16-year career (1956-1971) and was the team's undisputed starter for the last 12 of those seasons. He was the Packers' starting quarterback for all five of the NFL championships the team won in the 1960s and was the Most Valuable Player of the first two World Championship Games. He also had a nine-season run as the Packers' head coach from 1975–1983, but only two of the nine were winning seasons (one of those, 1982, was shortened by a strike, and was also Starr's only playoff appearance as a coach). Starr was inducted into the Hall of Fame in 1977. He died on May 26 at the age of 85.

Team owners
Bill Bidwill Bidwill was the owner of the Arizona Cardinals since the 1960s. He died on October 2 at the age of 88. The Bidwill family has been associated with the Cardinals since Bidwill's father Charles bought the team in 1933. His son Michael is expected to succeed his father as team owner.

Barron Hilton Hilton was the original owner of the Los Angeles Chargers from 1960–1966. He was the last living member of the original Foolish Club, the group of owners who established the American Football League (Hilton divested in 1966; second- and third-generation heirs of two members, Kenneth S. Adams, Jr. (daughters and grandsons) and Lamar Hunt (son), continue to operate their clubs).

Others

Preseason
Training camps for the 2019 season were held in late July through August. Teams started training camp no earlier than 15 days before their first scheduled preseason game. The Pro Football Hall of Fame Game was played on August 1; in which Denver defeated Atlanta at Tom Benson Hall of Fame Stadium in Canton, Ohio. Denver was represented in the 2019 Hall of Fame class by owner Pat Bowlen (posthumously) and former cornerback Champ Bailey, while Atlanta was represented by former tight end Tony Gonzalez.

On August 17, Dallas and the Los Angeles Rams played a preseason game at Aloha Stadium in Honolulu, Hawaii, the former home of the Pro Bowl.

On August 22, Oakland played Green Bay at IG Field in Winnipeg, home of the CFL's Winnipeg Blue Bombers; it was the first NFL game on Canadian soil since the end of the Bills Toronto Series in 2013. Mosaic Stadium in Regina, Saskatchewan was another potential site for the game, and the teams had secured the cooperation of the city and local sports promoter On Ice Management, but the Saskatchewan Roughriders of the Canadian Football League (CFL) vetoed the proposal, as the Roughriders feared they would be unable to reconfigure the field from NFL to CFL standards in time for their August 24 home game (the CFL's Winnipeg Blue Bombers were away that weekend and thus did not have a scheduling conflict). Because of safety concerns caused by the reconfiguration of the goalposts, the NFL, at the last minute, shortened the playing field to 80 yards long (the first such known NFL usage of a field that short since 1932) and eliminated kickoffs, starting all possessions on the 15-yard line. Thirty-three Packers players refused to play on the surface, including starting quarterback Aaron Rodgers.

NFL centennial promotions
On October 18, 2018, the NFL announced that it would commemorate its 100th season throughout 2019, beginning with Super Bowl LIII in February 2019. An NFL 100 emblem was featured in promotions across all NFL properties during the season, worn on jerseys as a patch, placed on game balls, and painted on fields.

The Chicago Bears (who, as the Decatur Staleys, were one of the 14 charter members of the league) celebrated their centennial season with commemorative events throughout 2019. On November 15, 2018, the team unveiled a customized version of the league-wide centennial emblem (which was worn on jerseys in place of the NFL-branded version). The team also unveiled a throwback jersey based on its 1936 design, which it donned for two games.

The NFL aired a special two-minute commercial during Super Bowl LIII to launch the centennial campaign, which featured a gala dinner attended by 40 current and former NFL players, including Los Angeles Rams RB Todd Gurley, then-New York Giants WR Odell Beckham Jr., New England QB Tom Brady, former Indianapolis and Denver QB Peyton Manning, Hall of Fame WRs Jerry Rice and Michael Irvin, and Hall of Fame QB Terry Bradshaw, NFL commissioner Roger Goodell (who delivered the welcome address), NFL officials Ron Torbert and Sarah Thomas, viral teenage girl football star Samantha Gordon, and video game streamer Tyler "Ninja" Blevins. The commercial won the annual Super Bowl Ad Meter survey held by USA Today, marking the first time that the NFL itself won.

In honor of the site of the first NFL game, the league announced plans to donate a new artificial turf field to Triangle Park in Dayton, Ohio, home field of the former Dayton Triangles, intending for Cincinnati to hold a day of training camp at the site. However, the project was rejected by the city after concerns that construction could potentially disturb a Native American burial site. The NFL instead donated the turf to nearby Kettering Field. The Bengals still held a training camp day in Dayton, doing so at Welcome Stadium instead.

The NFL intentionally scheduled a weekly game to honor landmark moments in NFL history:

Regular season
The 2019 regular season's 256 games were played over a 17-week schedule that began on September 5, 2019. Each of the league's 32 teams played a 16-game schedule, with one bye week for each team. There were games on Monday nights and on Thursdays, including the National Football League Kickoff game and games on Thanksgiving Day. The regular season concluded with a full slate of 16 games on December 29, all of which were intra-division matchups, as it had been since .

Scheduling formula
Under the NFL's current scheduling formula, each team played the other three teams in its own division twice. In addition, teams played against all four teams in one other division from each conference. The final two games on a team's schedule were against the two remaining teams in the same conference that had finished in the same position in their respective divisions in 2018 (e.g., the team that finished fourth in its division played all three other teams in the conference that also finished fourth). The division parings for 2019 were as follows:

The entire schedule was released on April 17, 2019.

Highlights of the 2019 season included:
 NFL Kickoff Game: The Kickoff Game was played September 5. Chicago hosted Green Bay in honor of the Bears' and the NFL's centennial season, a game announced on March 25 ahead of the rest of the schedule. Green Bay won the game, 10–3. The move broke with the league tradition to give the defending Super Bowl champion the hosting rights to the first game of the season; New England instead hosted the first Sunday Night Football game against Pittsburgh, which the New England won 33–3.
 NFL International Series: Five games were held outside the United States in 2019. In addition to Jacksonville and the three teams who hosted an annual game abroad as part of their relocation agreements (the Los Angeles Chargers, Los Angeles Rams, and Oakland), Tampa Bay also hosted a home game abroad in 2019 as part of their agreement to host Super Bowl LV in 2021.
NFL London Games: Four games were played in London in 2019: Oakland hosted and defeated Chicago on October 6 and Tampa Bay hosted and lost to Carolina on October 13, both at Tottenham Hotspur Stadium. The Los Angeles Rams hosted and defeated Cincinnati on October 27 and Jacksonville hosted and lost to the Houston on November 3, both at Wembley Stadium. Houston and Carolina both made their first trip to London, leaving Green Bay as the only NFL team to have not played a game in London.
 NFL Mexico Game: The Los Angeles Chargers hosted and lost to Kansas City at Estadio Azteca in Mexico City on November 18. 
 Thanksgiving Day: As has been the case since , three games were played on Thanksgiving Day, November 28, including the traditional afternoon doubleheader hosted by Detroit (defeated by the Chicago for the second year in a row) and Dallas Cowboys (defeated by Buffalo). Atlanta hosted and lost to New Orleans in the night game; the two teams had played on Thanksgiving night in 2018 as well.

Scheduling changes
When the entire season schedule was released on April 17, the league announced Saturday games to be played in Week 16. On November 12, the NFL announced that three games would be moved from Sunday to Saturday
Week 8: The Oakland–Houston game was moved from 1:00 p.m. ET to 4:25 p.m. ET, trading time slots with the Denver–Indianapolis game; both games remained on CBS.
Week 10: The Carolina–Green Bay game was moved from 1:00 p.m. ET to 4:25 p.m. ET; game remained on Fox.
Week 11: The New York Jets–Washington game was cross-flexed from CBS to Fox; game remained at 1:00 p.m. ET.
Week 12: The Green Bay–San Francisco game, originally at 4:25 p.m ET on Fox, was flexed into the NBC Sunday Night Football 8:20 p.m. ET timeslot, replacing the originally scheduled Seattle–Philadelphia game, which was moved to 1:00 p.m. ET on Fox. In addition, the Carolina–New Orleans game was cross-flexed from Fox to CBS and the Miami–Cleveland game was cross-flexed from CBS to Fox; kickoff times for both games remained at 1:00 p.m. ET.
Week 13: The Oakland–Kansas City game was moved from 1:00 p.m. ET to 4:25 p.m. ET, trading time slots with the Cleveland–Pittsburgh game; both games remained on CBS.
Week 15: The Buffalo–Pittsburgh game, originally scheduled at 1:00 p.m ET on CBS, was flexed into the NBC Sunday Night Football 8:20 p.m. ET timeslot, replacing the originally scheduled Minnesota–Los Angeles Chargers game, which was moved to 4:05 p.m. on CBS.
Week 16: Three games were moved to Saturday: Houston–Tampa Bay at 1:00 p.m. ET, Buffalo–New England at 4:30 p.m. ET, and Los Angeles Rams–San Francisco at 8:15 p.m. ET, all on the NFL Network. The two other games that the NFL had the option of moving (Detroit–Denver and Oakland–Los Angeles Chargers) remained on Sunday.
Week 17: The San Francisco–Seattle game that was originally scheduled for 4:25 p.m. ET on Fox was selected as the final 8:20 p.m. ET NBC Sunday Night Football game of the season, which decided the NFC West champion. In addition, the following games with playoff implications were rescheduled from 1:00 p.m. ET to 4:25 p.m. ET (with networks in parenthesis): Tennessee–Houston (CBS); Indianapolis-Jacksonville (CBS); Washington–Dallas (Fox); Philadelphia–New York Giants (Fox). The Cleveland–Cincinnati game was cross-flexed from CBS to Fox, but remained at 1:00 p.m. ET.

Regular season standings

Division

Conference

Postseason

The 2019 playoffs began on January 4–5, 2020 with the wild-card round. The four winners of these games visited the top two seeds in each conference in the Divisional Round games on January 11–12. The winners of those games advanced to the Conference Championships on January 19. The 2020 Pro Bowl was played at Camping World Stadium in Orlando on January 26. Super Bowl LIV was played at Hard Rock Stadium in Miami on February 2.

The start times for the Divisional Round games on Sunday, January 12, were moved to 3:00 p.m. and 6:30 p.m. ET (as is already the case with the conference championship games), rather than the typical 1:00 p.m. and 4:30 p.m. windows used for this round in previous seasons.

Bracket

Notable events

Andrew Luck's retirement
News of Indianapolis Colts quarterback and 2012 first overall pick Andrew Luck retiring broke out during the Colts' third preseason game. His retirement quickly became one of the most surprising revelations of the year. During his post-game press conference, Luck stated that his retirement was due to the recent mental and physical difficulties of playing football. Luck had won the NFL Comeback Player of the Year Award in 2018.

Antonio Brown controversies
Wide receiver Antonio Brown was involved in several controversies throughout the off-season, preseason, and regular season. Brown was held out by his former team, the Pittsburgh Steelers during week 17 of 2018 due to a heated falling out with quarterback Ben Roethlisberger. He was subsequently traded to the Oakland Raiders in March 2019. However, Brown's helmet model had been banned by the NFL due to inadequate protection, prompting Brown to hold out of practices and file two grievances against the NFL, both of which were denied. Brown then accepted the new helmet model and returned to practice, but later wore inadequate footwear in a cryogenic chamber and got frostbite on his feet, causing additional concern for his availability in Week 1. Brown next released recorded audio of Raiders head coach Jon Gruden and requested that the Raiders release him. He was subsequently released and signed with the New England Patriots. On September 10, allegations that Brown had raped his former trainer, Britney Taylor, caused speculation that he might be put on the commissioner's exempt list, barring him from playing. However, the NFL did not do so and Brown played in the Patriots' Week 2 game. On September 16, a second woman accused Brown of sexual misconduct. That same day, Pittsburgh-based Dr. Victor Prisk, who worked with Brown during his time with the Steelers, sued Brown for $11,500 in unpaid fees. The Patriots cut Brown on September 20 after he allegedly sent intimidating text messages to his second accuser.

Steelers–Browns brawl

In the final seconds of a November 14 Thursday Night Football matchup between the Pittsburgh Steelers and Cleveland Browns, Browns defensive end Myles Garrett tackled Steelers quarterback Mason Rudolph after Rudolph completed a screen pass to running back Trey Edmunds. Upset by the late tackle, Rudolph attacked Garrett by attempting to pull off Garrett's helmet. Garrett then ripped off Rudolph's helmet and used it to hit Rudolph in the head while being restrained by Steelers center Maurkice Pouncey and Steelers guard David DeCastro. Pouncey and Browns defensive tackle Larry Ogunjobi then joined in on the fight, with Pouncey punching and kicking Garrett's head several times. Garrett, Ogunjobi, and Pouncey were all ejected from the game. Following the game, Garrett was suspended for the remainder of 2019 and required to apply for reinstatement in 2020, while Pouncey and Ogunjobi received 2-game and 1-game suspensions, respectively. Garrett was reinstated in February 2020, ending his suspension after six games. The six-game suspension was the longest in NFL history for a single on-field transgression.

Patriots videotaping controversy
During the December 8 game between the Cincinnati Bengals and Cleveland Browns, the New England Patriots were alleged to have spied on the Bengals' sideline. The Patriots, who were scheduled to play the Bengals the following week, sent a video team to Cleveland to film a documentary of an advance scout, part of the "Do Your Job" series on the Patriots' website. This video contractor was given media credentials by the Browns, but the Bengals and NFL were not made aware of the presence of the Patriots' video crew. According to ESPN's Dianna Russini, a Bengals staffer spotted the Patriots' cameraman and proceeded to observe what he was doing. Allegedly, the cameraman proceeded to point his camera at the Bengals coaching staff and sideline for most of the quarter. The Bengals employee reported him to media relations, who reported him to security; security then seized the film and leaked it to Jay Glazer, who made the footage public. The NFL has launched an investigation into these allegations. This was the second time the current Patriots administration was involved in an unauthorized videotaping scandal, following the Spygate controversy in 2007.

Records, milestones, and notable statistics
Week 1
 The Baltimore Ravens scored 42 points in the first half, setting an NFL record for most points in the first half of a season opener.

Week 2
 Matt Ryan became the 12th player to throw 300 career touchdown passes
 Adrian Peterson passed Jim Brown for fifth place on the all-time rushing touchdowns list.
 JuJu Smith-Schuster became the youngest player in NFL history to record 2,500 career receiving yards, at the age of 22 years, 297 days, a record previously held by Randy Moss, who was 22 years, 310 days old.

Week 4
 Frank Gore became the fourth player in NFL history to rush for 15,000 yards.
 Larry Fitzgerald caught his 1,326th reception, moving into second place all-time, behind Jerry Rice.
 Von Miller recorded his 100th career sack, becoming the fourth-fastest player to do so (124 games).
 Jared Goff set the record for most completions in regulation of a regular season game, with 45. The previous record of 44 was set by Ben Roethlisberger.
Week 5
 Tom Brady passed Brett Favre for third place on the all-time passing yards list.

Week 6
 Tom Brady passed Peyton Manning for second place on the all-time passing yards list.
Justin Tucker became the fastest player to score 1,000 career points, doing so in 118 games. The record was previously held by Stephen Gostkowski who reached 1,000 points in 119 games.

Week 7
 Matthew Stafford became the fastest player to throw for 40,000 yards, doing so in 147 games. The record was previously held by Matt Ryan, who reached 40,000 yards in 151 games.
 Aaron Rodgers became the fastest player to throw for 350 touchdowns, doing so in 172 games. The record was previously held by Drew Brees, who reached 350 touchdowns in 180 games.
 Brett Maher became the first kicker in NFL history to kick three field goals of at least 60 yards in his career.
 Marvin Jones became the first player in NFL history to score four receiving touchdowns in a game in which he did not have at least 100 receiving yards; he caught 10 passes for 93 yards and the four touchdowns.

Week 8
 Bill Belichick became the third head coach in NFL history to win 300 games (regular season and postseason), joining George Halas and Don Shula.
 Drew Brees became the first quarterback to pass for 75,000 yards.
 Andy Dalton started the season with an 0–8 record.

Week 10
 Kyler Murray set the record for consecutive pass attempts by a rookie without an interception with 211, breaking the previous record of 176 shared by Derek Carr and Dak Prescott.
 Michael Thomas became the fastest player to reach 400 career receptions, doing so in 56 games.

Week 11
 Adam Vinatieri recorded his 710th career field goal attempt, setting an NFL record. The previous record of 709 attempts was held by Morten Andersen.

Week 12
 Frank Gore passed Barry Sanders for third place on the all-time rushing yards list. He also moved to third on the all-time rushing attempts list.

Week 13
 Drew Brees became the second quarterback to record 10,000 career pass attempts.
 Tom Brady passed Brett Favre for second place on the all-time completions list.

Week 14
 Matt Ryan became the tenth quarterback to throw for over 50,000 career passing yards.
 Drew Lock became the first rookie quarterback to achieve at least 300 passing yards and three passing touchdowns in his first road start.

Week 15
 Lamar Jackson passed Michael Vick's single season record for rushing yards by a quarterback with 1,039.
 Drew Brees recorded his 540th career touchdown pass, setting an NFL record. The previous record of 539 was held by Peyton Manning. 
Brees also set the record for highest completion percentage in a game (minimum 20 attempts) at 96.7% (29 of 30). The previous record of 96.6% was held by Philip Rivers.
 Julio Jones set the record for most career receiving yards through a players first nine seasons, with 11,881. The previous record of 11,864 was held by Torry Holt.

Week 16
 Michael Thomas set the new single-season record for most receptions in a season (ultimately 149), passing Marvin Harrison's previous mark of 143.

Week 17
 Tom Brady passed Peyton Manning for second place on the all-time passing touchdowns list.
 The Baltimore Ravens set the NFL record for most rushing yards in a season with 3,296. The previous record of 3,165 yards was held by the 1978 New England Patriots.
The Ravens became the first team in NFL history to average 200 passing yards and 200 rushing yards per game.
 Christian McCaffrey became the third player with 1,000 rushing yards and 1,000 receiving yards in the same season, joining Roger Craig and Marshall Faulk.
Jameis Winston became the first player to throw for at least 30 touchdowns and 30 interceptions in the same season.
Carson Wentz became the first player to throw for 4,000 passing yards in a season while having no wide receiver reach 500 receiving yards.
Adrian Peterson passed Edgerrin James for eighth place on the all-time rushing attempts list.

Wild Card Round
The New Orleans Saints became the first team in NFL history to win at least 13 games in a 16-game schedule and get eliminated in the wild-card round.
The Saints became the second team to be eliminated from the postseason on their final play of the game in three straight years, joining the 2013–15  Green Bay Packers.

Divisional Round
Derrick Henry became the first player in NFL history to have two games of 180 rushing yards in the same postseason.
The Tennessee Titans became the second team to win a postseason game, despite being outgained by at least 200 yards, joining the 2009 New Orleans Saints.
Lamar Jackson became the first player to have 300 passing yards and 140 rushing yards in any game, regular season or postseason.

Conference Championships
Raheem Mostert became the first player in NFL history to rush for at least 200 yards and four touchdowns in a playoff game.
Mostert became the first player to rush for 150 yards and three touchdowns in a single half of a playoff game, doing so in the first half.
Mostert's 248 rushing yards set the record for most rushing yards in a conference championship game. The previous record of 206 was held by Keith Lincoln.

Super Bowl
Kyle Shanahan joined his father Mike Shanahan as the first father-son duo to lead their teams to a Super Bowl as head coaches. The elder Shanahan previously coached the Denver Broncos in Super Bowls XXXII and XXXIII.
Deebo Samuel rushed for 53 yards, setting the Super Bowl record for most rushing yards by a wide receiver. The previous record of 45 was held by Percy Harvin during Super Bowl XLVIII.

Regular-season statistical leaders

Awards

Individual season awards

The 9th Annual NFL Honors, saluting the best players and plays from 2019 season, was held on February 1, 2020 at the Adrienne Arsht Center in Miami, Florida.

All-Pro team

The following players were named First Team All-Pro by the Associated Press:

Players of the week/month
The following were named the top performers during the 2019 season:

Head coaching and front office personnel changes

Head coaches

Off-season

In-season

Front office personnel

Off-season

Stadiums

Rams' and Chargers' new stadium
This was the third and final season for the Los Angeles Chargers at Dignity Health Sports Park and the fourth and final season for the Los Angeles Rams at Los Angeles Memorial Coliseum. Both teams moved to SoFi Stadium in Inglewood, California starting in 2020.

Bills' potential for relocation
A buyout window in the Buffalo Bills' lease on New Era Field opened after the 2019 season. The window allowed the team to cancel its lease on the stadium for a $28 million fee and relocate. If the Bills chose not to exercise the buyout window, they will not be allowed to relocate until after the 2022 season, when the current lease expires. The Bills chose not to exercise the buyout.

Broncos' naming rights
On September 4, the Denver Broncos' home field was rebranded as Empower Field at Mile High. Empower Retirement, a retirement plan provider that is based in Denver, had served as a team sponsor since , with the Broncos agreeing to terms on a 21-year deal that will run through 2039, though financial terms were not disclosed.

Raiders' relocation

This was the final season for the Oakland Raiders at RingCentral Coliseum (renamed from the Oakland–Alameda County Coliseum in May 2019) before moving to Allegiant Stadium in Las Vegas, Nevada. The Raiders' lease on the Coliseum expired after the 2018 season. The Coliseum management expressed a reluctance to allow the Raiders to continue using the Coliseum after the lease expired unless the team paid more to cover the losses the Coliseum incurred by hosting Raiders games. In December 2018, the city of Oakland filed a lawsuit against the Raiders and the NFL seeking financial damages and unpaid debt, claiming the relocation was illegal but not asking for an injunction forcing the team to stay. The Raiders stated that if any legal action was filed against them, that they would not renew with the Coliseum and find another, undetermined, temporary home for 2019 until Allegiant Stadium was finished. The Raiders then attempted to negotiate a lease with Oracle Park in San Francisco before the San Francisco 49ers vetoed the plan as an infringement on their territorial rights. With the 49ers refusing to waive territorial rights, the Raiders were forced to either renegotiate with the Coliseum or find a temporary stadium outside the San Francisco Bay Area (something that the Raiders management was reluctant to do, though the team acknowledged and considered bids from San Antonio, Texas and Tucson, Arizona). The Raiders, despite reservations about providing funds to the lawsuit being filed against them, negotiated a return to the Coliseum for 2019; a tentative agreement, pending Coliseum and league approval, was announced February 25. The lease agreement was approved by the Oakland Coliseum Authority, the Oakland city council, and Alameda County supervisors by March 21. The Coliseum was the last multi-purpose stadium to be the home of both an NFL and Major League Baseball team (the Oakland Athletics). Barring any future relocations, the Raiders' September 15 game against the Kansas City Chiefs stands as the last NFL game played on a dirt infield.

Uniforms

Uniform changes
Carolina Panthers: The Panthers switched to Nike's newest uniform template and updated their pants, removing the team logo from it and streamlining the piping stripe.
Cleveland Browns: On September 4, the Browns announced that they would switch to their former Color Rush uniforms as their primary home set this season, and wore these uniforms for six home games.
Houston Texans: On April 22, the Texans announced that they would add their primary logo on the back of their jerseys, their first uniform update in franchise history. The addition of the logo on the jersey's back makes them the third team in the NFL to do so, after the Arizona Cardinals and Buffalo Bills.
Los Angeles Chargers: On April 16, the Chargers announced that they made their powder blue alternate jerseys the new primary uniforms. In addition to this announcement, they also swapped out their navy blue facemask for gold.
Minnesota Vikings: On August 8, the Vikings announced an adjustment of the shade of purple on their helmets to better match the shade on the team's uniforms.
New York Jets: On April 4, the Jets unveiled new uniforms, which introduced black as an accent color and resembled a modernized version of the uniform layout the Jets used from 1978 to 1997, including a return to green helmets and "TV numbers" on the shoulders.

Throwback uniforms
Chicago Bears: To celebrate their 100th season, the Bears wore throwback jerseys based on their 1936 uniforms for two home games.

Patches
 31 teams wore a version of the NFL centennial emblem, with the NFL shield beneath the "100," on the yoke of their jerseys in place of the regular NFL shield. The Chicago Bears instead wore their own centennial team patch, a customized version of the league-wide centennial emblem with the Bears' colors and logo, on the left side of the jersey.
 The Carolina Panthers and Jacksonville Jaguars wore patches to commemorate the 25th season for each franchise.
The Oakland Raiders, Kansas City Chiefs and Los Angeles Chargers wore patches to commemorate the 60th season for each franchise.
 On October 10, the Arizona Cardinals unveiled a patch to commemorate the death of team owner Bill Bidwill. It featured his initials, "WVB."

Media
This was the sixth year under the current broadcast contracts with ESPN/ABC, CBS, Fox and NBC. This includes "cross-flexing" (switching) Sunday afternoon games between CBS and Fox before or during the season (regardless of the conference of the visiting team). NBC airs Sunday Night Football, the annual Kickoff Game, and the primetime Thanksgiving game. ESPN airs Monday Night Football and the Pro Bowl with the latter being simulcast on ABC. Fox airs Thursday Night Football along with NFL Network, with Amazon Video and Twitch continuing to simulcast those games online in the second and final year of the two sites' current contract. Fox will also broadcast Super Bowl LIV. ESPN aired coverage for all three days of the 2019 NFL Draft on ABC, replacing Fox's broadcast television simulcast of NFL Network in 2018. ABC's coverage catered towards a mainstream audience and was hosted by the panel of ESPN's College GameDay, while ESPN and NFL Network continued to carry more conventional coverage of the draft.

Under a one-year test, local stations in markets with NFL teams are allowed on a limited basis to air another NFL game opposite the game involving that city's home team, something that had previously been forbidden (this rule had already been waived for the Washington, D.C. market when the Baltimore Ravens are playing at the same time as the Washington Redskins on the opposite network – Washington, D.C. is a secondary market for the Ravens, for the Los Angeles market after the Rams' and Chargers' moves to LA and league-wide for Week 17 since 2014). It was originally reported that all media markets in the U.S. who have CBS and Fox affiliates will have access to three Sunday afternoon games every week regardless of whether the local team is playing at home. The league later clarified that teams will still be able to impose the home exclusivity blackout on a limited basis, so long as they lift the exclusivity at least twice.

The league has an option to cancel its contract with DirecTV after the 2019 season. DirecTV has had exclusive rights to the league's out-of-market sports package, NFL Sunday Ticket, since the package was introduced in 1994.

Personnel changes
On February 28, 2019, Jason Witten announced he would be leaving his color commentator position on Monday Night Football after one season; he returned to the Dallas Cowboys, where he had played tight end for fifteen seasons before joining ESPN in 2018. Witten was not replaced; Booger McFarland, who spent the previous season commentating from atop a crane-like contraption on the sideline, was moved into the booth. Former referee Jeff Triplette also left Monday Night Football as rules analyst. He was replaced with John Parry, who retired the same day his ESPN position was announced; Parry is the third rules analyst ESPN has hired in two years, following Triplette and Gerald Austin. Steve Tasker departed CBS after 21 seasons with the network, all but one as a color commentator, after CBS declined to renew Tasker's contract. Tasker anticipates moving to radio and calling games for Westwood One for the 2019 season. Twitch added "co-streaming" with live commentary from specially chosen users of the service for its 2019 Thursday night games.

Most watched regular season games
DH = doubleheader; SNF = NBC Sunday Night Football

*Note – Late DH matchups listed in table are the matchups that were shown to the largest percentage of the market.

References

2019 National Football League season
National Football League seasons
NFL